Bob Levy may refer to:

Bob Levy (New Jersey politician) (born 1947), former mayor of Atlantic City, New Jersey
Bob Levy (Canadian politician), Canadian politician and judge
Bob Levy (Texas politician) in United States House of Representatives elections, 2000
Bob Levy (comedian) (born 1962), stand-up comedian and radio personality
Bob Levy (TV producer) of The Vampire Diaries (season 4)

See also
Robert Levy (disambiguation)